"Es Tut Wieder Weh" (engl. It Hurts Again) is a song by German alternative band Jennifer Rostock, and was released as the second single from the soundtrack to the film New Moon on 18 December 2009. The song has already been played during the band's live shows and was recorded and mixed in only one week.

Song information
Lyrically, the song is about having lost a beloved person, especially a life partner and seeing this person again, which is connected to a heavy pain.

Extract
Du Tauchst In Mein Leben. 
Und Mein Leben Wird Kalt. 
Und Deine Versprechen Werden Müde Und Alt. 
Du Tauchst In Mein Leben. 
Und Ich spür', Wie Es Sticht. 
Denn Du Siehst Mich Nicht. 
Oh, Du Siehst Mich Nicht.

English Translation:

You Appear In My Life. 
And My Life Becomes Cold. 
And All Your Promises Become Tired And Old. 
You Appear In My Life. 
And I Feel How It Hurts. 
Because You Don’t See Me. 
Oh, You Don’t See Me.

Track listing/formats
From Amazon.

Music video
The music video for "Es Tut Wieder Weh" was directed by Hagen Decker and had its premiere on MyVideo on 25 November 2009 and shows the band performing the song in black mirrored room. While they play, there are also scenes from New Moon intercut.

Chart performance

Personnel
Jennifer Weist - Vocals
Johannes "Joe" Walter - Keyboard
Alex Voigt - Guitar
Christoph Deckert - Bass
Christopher "Baku" Kohl - Drums

References

Songs about death
Songs about depression
2009 singles
Songs written for films
2009 songs
Warner Music Group singles
Songs from The Twilight Saga (film series)